Johannes Winding Harbitz (26 December 1831 – 5 September 1917) was a Norwegian politician for the Conservative Party.

He was born in Askvold as the oldest son of vicar and politician Georg Prahl Harbitz and his wife Maren Mariken Hof. He enrolled as a student in 1850, but soon took off to work at sea. He took the mate's examination in 1852, and worked as a shipmaster from 1859 to 1869, as well as ship-owner. He was also vice consul from the mid-1880s, at that time living in Tønsberg.

He was elected to the Norwegian Parliament in 1880, representing the urban constituency Tønsberg. He was re-elected on four occasions, serving a total of five terms. He was also mayor of Tønsberg for twelve years. On 2 May 1893 he was appointed to the second cabinet Stang as a member of the Council of State Division in Stockholm. He left on 1 July 1894 to become Minister of Defence. On 1 April the next year there was a reshuffle and he was appointed Minister of Auditing. He held this post until October 1895, when the second cabinet Stang fell.

He moved from Tønsberg to Vestre Aker i 1897, and died in 1917. He was married to Louise Henriette Betty Lunnevig, daughter of Ole Lunnevig in Tønsberg.

References

1831 births
1917 deaths
Conservative Party (Norway) politicians
Government ministers of Norway
Members of the Storting
Mayors of places in Vestfold
Politicians from Tønsberg
Norwegian businesspeople
Defence ministers of Norway